This is a list of the Swiss Hitparade number ones of 2016.

Swiss charts

Romandie charts

References 

 Swisschart No.1 Singles and Albums 2016
 Swiss Romandie Singles Chart

Number-one hits
Switzerland
2016